Bologna School may refer to:

Bolognese School, school of painting in Bologna, Italy
Bologna School, a Roman Catholic school of ecclesiastical history
Bologna School of music, term for a group of composers active in 17th century Bologna